Arthur Hugh Percy (5 April 1880 – 14 July 1964) was an Australian rules footballer who played for the South Melbourne Football Club in the Victorian Football League (VFL).

Notes

External links 

1880 births
1964 deaths
Sydney Swans players
Australian rules footballers from Albury